The Sabine shiner (Notropis sabinae) is a species of ray-finned fish in the genus Notropis.

It is endemic to the United States.  It is native to:
 St. Francis and lower White, and lower Black River drainages in Missouri and Arkansas.
 Little River system (lower Red River of the South drainage) in Louisiana.
 Gulf Coast drainages from Calcasieu River in Louisiana to San Jacinto River in Texas.

References 

 Robert Jay Goldstein, Rodney W. Harper, Richard Edwards: American Aquarium Fishes. Texas A&M University Press 2000, p. 88
 

Sabine shiner
Endemic fauna of the United States
Fish of the Eastern United States
Fauna of the Plains-Midwest (United States)
Freshwater fish of the Southeastern United States
Sabine shiner
Taxa named by David Starr Jordan